Kopperuncholan was a Tamil king of the Early Cholas mentioned in Sangam Literature. We have no definite details about this Chola or his reign. The only information we have is from the fragmentary poems of Sangam in the Purananuru.

Sources 
The only source available to us on Kopperuncholan is the mentions in Sangam poetry. The period covered by the extant literature of the Sangam is unfortunately not easy to determine with any measure of certainty. Except the longer epics Silappatikaram and Manimekalai, which by common consent belong to the age later than the Sangam age, the poems have reached us in the forms of systematic anthologies. Each individual poem has generally attached to it a colophon on the authorship and subject matter of the poem, the name of the king or chieftain to whom the poem relates and the occasion which called forth the eulogy are also found.

It is from these colophons and rarely from the texts of the poems themselves, that we gather the names of many kings and chieftains and the poets patronised by them. The task of reducing these names to an ordered scheme in which the different generations of contemporaries can be marked off one another has not been easy. To add to the confusions, some historians have even denounced these colophons as later additions and untrustworthy as historical documents.

Any attempt at extracting a systematic chronology and data from these poems should be aware of the casual nature of these poems and the wide difference between the purposes of the anthologist who collected these poems and the historian’s attempts are arriving at a continuous history.

Friendship with Poets

Kopperuncholan is the subject of a number of poems in Purananuru. Himself a poet, he is credited with a few poems in the Kuruntokai collection (Kuruntokai – 20, 53, 129, 147) and Purananuru (song 215). He was an intimate friend of many poets, the most notable among them being, Picirāntaiyār, Pullārrūr Eyiŗŗiyaņār and Pottiyār. Picirāntaiyār was a native of the Pandya country while the latter two were natives of Chola country. Pullārrūr Eyiŗŗiyaņār is renowned for his advice to the Chola king. Kopperuncholan’s friendship with these two poets became a classic example in later literature like that between Damon and Pythias.

Andayar’s poems reflect the happy and joyful nature of the poet. Asked once why though old, his hair had not turned gray, he gave this answer:
My years are many, yet my locks not grey:
You ask the reason why, 'tis simply this
I have a worthy wife, and children too;
My servants move obedient to my will;
My king does me no evil, aye protects;
To crown the whole, around me dwell good men
And true, of chastened souls with knowledge filled.
(Purananuru –191)

Kopperuncholan’s Suicide

There are a number of poems in Purananuru in sequence describing the sad end of this king.

Kopperuncholan and his two sons had a serious quarrel. His two sons vie the throne and raise an army against their father. As Kopperuncholan prepares for war, Pullārrūr Eyiŗŗiyaņār, a poet and a friend reasons with him that if he slays his own sons and wins the war then the country would be left without an heir, and on the other hand if he loses then they would become victors. So he advises the king to take his own life thereby leaving an heir to his kingdom and at the same time denying them all glory. The king would commit suicide by the rite of vadakiruttal, a Tamil act of committing suicide, where the victim sits facing north and starves himself to death. (Excerpt from Purananuru, song 213):

Kopperuncholan takes the advice of the poet and takes his own life by vadakirruttal along with those closest to him. But before he sits facing north with the sword by his side he informs his men of his desire to see his friend Picirāntaiyār, a poet in the neighboring Pandya kingdom. His men send word but then tell him that Picirāntaiyār may not come. To this the king replies, (excerpt from Purananuru, song 215):

Picirāntaiyār arrives and joins his friend in his desire to quit this world (Purananuru, the song (218) of Kannakanār as he saw Picirāntaiyār taking his seat and facing north). Another poet, Karuvūrp Peruñcatukkattup Pūtanātanār is distressed that the king forgot to invite him and sings thus: (Purananuru 219):

After the king's death, Pottiyār another poet, unable to bear the loss of his patron, sits facing north amidst the heroes' stones and commits suicide by vadakirruttal. He reasons that the spirit of the dead king has given him permission to do so: (Purananuru - song 223);

See also
 Sangam Literature
 Early Cholas
 Legendary early Chola kings

Notes

References 
 Mudaliar, A.S, Abithana Chintamani (1931), Reprinted 1984 Asian Educational Services, New Delhi.
 Nilakanta Sastri, K.A. (1935). The CōĻas, University of Madras, Madras (Reprinted 1984).
 Nilakanta Sastri, K.A. (1955). A History of South India, OUP, New Delhi (Reprinted 2002).
 Project Madurai – Purananuru eText
 Poets of the Tamil Anthologies: Ancient Poems of Love and War, George L. Hart III, Princeton: Princeton University Press

Chola kings